Băile Tușnad is a town in Harghita County, Romania in eastern Transylvania.

With a population of 1,617, it is the smallest town in Romania by population. It is located at an altitude of 650 metres in the southern reaches of the Ciuc depression, between the Harghita and Bodoc mountains, in the valley of the Olt, and is to this day an important spa town. The town administers one village, Carpitus (Kárpitus).

History

The town and the surrounding area are famous for their spas and mineral waters received from seven springs. Nearby is the Lake Sfânta Ana, a famous volcanic crater lake, the only one of its kind in Romania.

The water has long been used for bathing by the Székely people. The most probable date for the founding of the bathing station is 1842. It was an alleged miraculous healing of the son of a shepherd from his rashes that first attracted widespread attention to the therapeutic properties of local mineral waters, after which a company was founded to develop the springs in 1845. The bathing station was destroyed in the skirmishes of 1849, but Austrian Emperor Franz Joseph, on visiting the town in 1852, ordered the reconstruction of the baths.

The rapid development of the town began after 1860. The Mikes-source was named in honour of count Benedek Mikes, chairman of the spa committee, who appointed a chemist at his own expense to analyse the water of the spring bearing his name. This marked the start of the scientific evaluation and utilisation of local mineral waters. The Stefánia Medical Center was opened in 1890 and remained the treatment center of the spa until 1975. Lake Csukás (now: Ciucaș) was artificially created in 1900, and the big hotels of the town were built in the 1970s.

The settlement was historically part of the Székely Land area of Transylvania and belonged to Csíkszék district until the administrative reform of Transylvania in 1876, when it fell within Csík County in the Kingdom of Hungary. After the Treaty of Trianon of 1920, it became part of Romania and fell within Ciuc County during the interwar period. In 1940, the second Vienna Award granted the Northern Transylvania to Hungary and it was held by Hungary until 1944.

After Soviet occupation, the Romanian administration returned and the town became officially part of Romania in 1947. Between 1952 and 1960, the commune fell within the Magyar Autonomous Region, between 1960 and 1968 the Mureș-Magyar Autonomous Region. In 1968, the province was abolished, and since then, the commune, as a town, has been part of Harghita County.

Demographics 
The population of the town is 1,617; it has a Székely Hungarian majority with 1,460 (90.3%) Hungarians (2011 census). There are also small communities of ethnic Romanians (6.9%) and Romani (2.6%).

Historical demographic data:

Demographic trends according to the censuses:

Spa information

Therapeutic indications 
Cardiovascular disease (post heart attack recovery, circulatory problems);
Valvular disease of the heart muscle, hypertension, circulatory problems);
Nervous system disorders (neurasthenia, neurovegetative dystonia, secondary asthenic conditions, physical and intellectual fatigue);
Digestive problems (stomach diseases, functional bowel disorders, chronic gastritis, enterocolitis, biliary dyskinesia);
Endocrine disorders (hyperthyroidism mild adrenal insufficiency, Basedow's disease);

Types of treatments
Spa with CO2, mofettes, galvanic baths, massage;
 Paraffin, herbal baths, massage;
 Magneto-diaflux, ionization medical gymnastics;
 Internal treatment with mineral water, manual reflex massage;
 Magnet therapy, soil treatment;

Elements of natural treatment
 Carbonated mineral water, chlorine, sodium, bicarbonate;
 Moffettes;
 Subalpine tonic-stimulant bioclimate;

Composition of mineral water sources 
 Stănescu Spring: output of 405 L / h, T 7 °C, pH 6.2; naturally carbonated, with bicarbonate, sodium, calcium, magnesium;
 Apor Spring: output of 7200 L / h, T 7 °C, pH 5.3; hypotonic, naturally carbonated, ferruginous, with chlorine, bicarbonate, sodium, calcium;
 Mikes Spring: free output, T 14 °C, pH 5.6; hypotonic, naturally carbonated, mildly ferruginous, with chlorine, bicarbonate, sodium.

Twin towns – sister cities 
Băile Tușnad is twinned with:
 Balatonalmádi, Hungary
 Bicske, Hungary
 Csepel (Budapest), Hungary
 Harkány, Hungary
 Jánoshalma, Hungary
 Orosháza, Hungary
 Pestszentlőrinc-Pestszentimre (Budapest), Hungary

Gallery

See also
Tusványos

References

External links 

 Picture gallery in Băile Tuşnad
 Photos Baile Tusnad
 A short movie about Tusnad Spa
 St. Anna lake and Tusnad Spa viewed from paraglider 
 Tusnad mineral waters

Towns in Romania
Populated places in Harghita County
Localities in Transylvania
Székely communities
Spa towns in Romania